MORE Electric and Power Corporation, also known as MORE Power, is an electric power distribution company in the Philippines. It has been serving Iloilo City since 2019, after its controversial takeover of the power distribution assets of private firm Panay Electric Company (PECO).

The name "MORE" is an acronym for Monte Oro Resources & Energy, Inc., a subsidiary of Prime Strategic Holdings, Inc. (formerly known as Prime Metroline Holdings, Inc.) of billionaire Enrique Razon.

History 
MORE Power was founded in 2018 under the parent company of Prime Strategic Holdings, Inc. of Enrique K. Razon. On February 14, 2019, it was granted a 25-year power distribution franchise in Iloilo City signed by President Rodrigo Duterte, after Panay Electric Company (PECO)'s 97-year-long service franchise in the city expired earlier on January 18, 2019.

On July 30, 2022, MORE Power's proposed expanding its power distribution service in Iloilo province lapsed into law under Republic Act 11918, or the modified MORE Power franchise. The expansion of MORE Power’s service areas covered Alimodian, Leganes, Leon, New Lucena, Pavia, San Miguel, Santa Barbara, Zarraga, Anilao, Banate, Barotac Nuevo, Dingle, Dueñas, Dumangas, San Enrique, and Passi City. The service areas were previously served by Iloilo Electric Cooperatives (ILECO) I and III.

In August 2022, the company announced that it would finance the installation of underground cabling in Iloilo City with an agreement to split the total expenses with the telecommunications companies servicing the city. MORE Power plans to begin burying utility cable wires first in Calle Real in Iloilo City Proper, as early as 2023.

References

External links 

 Official website

Electric power companies of the Philippines
Companies based in Iloilo City
2018 establishments in the Philippines
Companies established in 2018